The National Front Party (Barnas) is a political party in Indonesia. It was founded by Vence Rumangkang, former member of the Democratic Party advisory board.

The party contested the 2009 elections, but won only 0.7 percent of the vote, less than the 2.5 percent electoral threshold, meaning it was awarded no seats in the People's Representative Council.

Regional strength
In the legislative election held on 9 April 2009, support for Barnas was higher than the party's national average in the following provinces:

Aceh 0.9%

North Sumatra 0.9%

Bengkulu 1.1%

Riau 0.7%

Jambi 1.0%

South Sumatra 1.7%

Banten 0.8%

West Kalimantan 1.4%

Central Kalimantan 0.8%

West Nusa Tenggara 0.9%

East Nusa Tenggara 1.0%

West Sulawesi 0.7%

North Sulawesi 2.2%

South Sulawesi 0.8%

South East Sulawesi 1.2%

Maluku 0.9%

North Maluku 1.3%

West Papua 1.6%

References

Pancasila political parties
Political parties in Indonesia